"Goin' Down" is a song by the American pop rock band the Monkees, written by all four members of the group along with Diane Hildebrand. It was first released as the B-side to the "Daydream Believer" single on Colgems Records on October 25, 1967, in support of the band's fourth album, Pisces, Aquarius, Capricorn & Jones Ltd.. The song managed to bubble under the Billboard Hot 100 upon its release.

Composition

Music
According to interviews with various members of the band, the song was inspired by Mose Allison's "Parchman Farm." Michael Nesmith explained, "Peter [Tork] had always loved to jam on 'Parchman Farm' and started off on this thing.  We just headed off into la-la land. Then Micky [Dolenz] started riffing this thing over the top of it." Tork added, "Somebody gave me an arrangement of 'Parchman Farm' that a friend of theirs had sort of generated – the real folk process at work. I had played that version around for a while amongst the guys. I don't remember why we started playing it that day, but we just jammed it unrehearsed." Dolenz concluded, "It was the exact same song, and we were covering it basically. So we did the tracks, and it came out real good. I remember Mike saying, 'All it is is the chord progression; we're not going to steal the melody or anything. Let's use this track but write other words, another melody to it. Why should we just cover somebody else's tune?' So I said, 'OK, fine. Good idea.'"

The song features energetic, rapid lead vocals by Dolenz and big band influences, with an arrangement by jazz musician Shorty Rogers and a high-note trumpet solo by Wrecking Crew member Bud Brisbois.

Lyrics
Diane Hildebrand's lyrics to "Goin' Down" describe a man whose relationship has ended, and he attempts to "end it all" by drunkenly leaping into the river to be dragged away by the current. He immediately regrets the decision and comes to a self-realization before coming to shore in New Orleans to partake in its "swingin' scenes". Dolenz explained, "Diane Hildebrand was given the track, and she was told to go away and write a song. She came back with this song, and I started practicing it. Singing it like this (adopts slow tempo). She said, 'No, no. It's twice that fast.' I was doing it half-time. I remember that I said, 'What?!' She said, 'Yes, it's twice that fast.' I get a lot of comments about that tune. (On the TV show) I did that live. You don't see nobody doing that stuff these days, do ya?"

Reception and legacy
With the song's A-side "Daydream Believer" reaching number one on the Billboard Hot 100, "Goin' Down" managed to chart at number 104 nationally. After its release, the composition became a staple of the Monkees' touring setlists, with a live version of the song appearing on the album 2001: Live in Las Vegas. An extended rendition of "Goin' Down" also appears on the deluxe version of Pisces, Aquarius, Capricorn & Jones Ltd., Greatest Hits, The Best of the Monkees, and Extended Versions.

In 2012, the composition was used in the television show Breaking Bad. Dolenz, who was unaware it was to be featured on the show, commented, "'Goin' Down' has nothing to do with drugs, obviously. And I certainly don't condone meth — that is nasty stuff that kills a lot of people and ruins a lot of lives. ... On the other hand, I like the TV show, it's very well-made. ... And no, I didn't make a penny".

Personnel
Adapted from Pisces, Aquarius, Capricorn & Jones Ltd.: Deluxe Edition CD liner notes.

Musicians
 Micky Dolenz – lead vocals
 Michael Nesmith – electric guitar
 Peter Tork – electric guitar
 Chip Douglas – bass guitar
 Eddie Hoh – drums
 Bud Brisbois – trumpet
 Virgil Evans – trumpet
 Uan Rasey – trumpet
 Thomas Scott – trumpet
 Bobby Helfer – trumpet, bass clarinet
 Lou Blackburn – trombone
 Dick Nash – trombone
 Dick Leith – bass trombone
 Phil Teele – bass trombone
 Buddy Collette – saxophone
 Bill Hood – saxophone
 Plas Johnson – saxophone
 John Lowe – bass saxophone, bass clarinet

Technical
 Shorty Rogers – arrangement
 Chip Douglas – producer

References

1967 singles
1967 songs
American jazz songs
The Monkees songs
Songs written by Michael Nesmith
Songs written by Micky Dolenz
Songs about rivers
Songs written by Diane Hildebrand
Vocal jazz songs